Kapelle is a municipality and a town in the southwestern Netherlands on Zuid-Beveland. As of January 2017, the municipality's population amounts to 12,620.

Population centers

Topography

The municipality of Kapelle, June 2015

Transport
 Kapelle-Biezelinge railway station

Famous people

 Annie M.G. Schmidt (1911 in Kapelle – 1995) a Dutch writer, the mother of the Dutch theatrical song 
 Jan Elburg (born 1919 in Wemeldinge – 1992) a Dutch poet
 Jan Peter Balkenende (born 1956 Biezelinge) a retired politician, Prime Minister of the Netherlands from 2002 to 2010 
 Jan Kees de Jager (born 1969 in Kapelle) a retired Dutch politician, former Dutch finance minister

Sport 
 François Marits (1884 in Kapelle – 1945) a Dutch sports shooter, competed at the 1924 Summer Olympics
 Jo de Roo (born 1937 in Schore) a Dutch former professional road racing cyclist
 John Karelse (born 1970 in Wemeldinge) a retired Dutch football goalkeeper with 421 club caps
 Aron Schreuder (born 2000 in Kapelle) a famous Dutch futsal player, Groene Ster Vlissingen

International relations

Twin towns — Sister cities
Kapelle is twinned with:

Gallery

References

External links

Official website

 
Municipalities of Zeeland
Populated places in Zeeland
Zuid-Beveland